Thomas Dutronc (born 16 June 1973 in Paris) is a French singer and jazz manouche guitarist. His mother is the singer, songwriter, guitarist Françoise Hardy; his father the singer, songwriter, guitarist, and film actor Jacques Dutronc.

Career
On 13 February 2008, he received the UNAC award for his song "J'aime plus Paris". It also became the most played French single around the world during 2008.

On 8 March 2008, he was nominated at the 23rd Victoires de la Musique in two categories, as new artist of the year and album of the year.

In 2020, he released the album Frenchy, which features guest performances by artists such as Iggy Pop, Dianna Krall, Billy Gibbons, and Rocky Gresset.

Philanthropy
Thomas Dutronc has been a member of the charity ensemble Les Enfoirés since 2009.

Awards
 2008: Globes de Cristal Award - Best Male Singer for "Comme un manouche sans guitare"
 2009: Victoires de la Musique (France) – Original song of the year for "Comme un manouche sans guitare"

Discography

Albums

Singles

*Did not appear in the official Belgian Ultratop 50 charts, but rather in the bubbling under Ultratip charts.

References

External links
Official Web Site
Thomas Dutronc on YouTube 
Thomas Dutronc on MySpace
Thomas Dutronc Discography 
Thomas Dutronc on Last.fm 

1973 births
French jazz guitarists
French male guitarists
French rock guitarists
French rock singers
Living people
Musicians from Paris
21st-century French singers
21st-century guitarists
21st-century French male singers
French male jazz musicians
Mercury Records artists